James F. Reda (born August 27, 1953 in Brooklyn, New York) is an executive compensation consultant, academic, author, as well as Founder and Managing director of James F. Reda & Associates.

Reda is the first consultant to be appointed to task forces convened by the National Association of Corporate Directors and The Conference Board. He has testified in front of Congress numerous times, notably in 2007 before the House of Representatives Committee on Oversight and Government Reform about executive pay for corporations receiving a government bailout.

Reda regularly appears on business news segments and has been featured on Lou Dobbs Tonight, The Newshour with Jim Lehrer, Fox Business News, BBC World Radio Service, ABC News, Bloomberg TV, and the CBS Early Show.

Early life and education 
Reda was born and raised in Brooklyn, New York. After graduating from high school at age 16, he spent six years traveling the world with the U.S. Navy as a Petty Officer for a nuclear submarine program. He also joined the Coast Guard Reserve, eventually retiring with the rank of Lt. Commander.

Reda attended Columbia University on the G.I. Bill and graduated with a Bachelor of Science in Industrial Engineering. Reda was the President of the Institute of Industrial Engineers while at Columbia and worked as a radio broadcast engineer for the university's radio station, WKCR. Throughout college, Reda was also employed as an engineer at Hewlett-Packard and IBM and served as a postman for the United States Postal Service.

He obtained a Masters in Management from the Massachusetts Institute of Technology. Following his studies, Reda held jobs with Wang Laboratories, Honeywell, Deloitte, Buck Consultants, and Joe Bachelder.

James F. Reda & Associates 
Reda formed James F. Reda & Associates in 2004. The company provides corporate governance compensation advisory services including the creation, planning and implementation of base and total cash compensation programs to both public and private clients in the US. According to Compliance Week, “they also specialize in the development of total rewards strategies, competitive market reviews, change-in-control and severance analysis, equity strategy and valuation techniques, and assessments of relative company performance.” Reda and his colleagues regularly conduct economic studies on executive compensation.

Reda's wife, Deborah L., has been the head of the firm's marketing department since its inception. His children— Linda, James, and Jennifer— have played an active role by completing summer internships and designing holiday cards for the firm.

In Feb. 2011, the company was purchased by the global insurance brokerage, Arthur J. Gallagher & Co.  James F. Reda & Associates continues to operate as a division of Gallagher Benefits Services Inc.

Bibliography

Books 
James F. Reda, Jim McMahon. “Pay to Win: How America’s Successful Companies Pay their Executives.” Harcourt. 2000..
James F. Reda, Stewart Reifler, Laura G. Thatcher. “The Compensation Committee Handbook.” Wiley. 2007: 3d edition..

References

American consultants
American non-fiction writers
1953 births
Living people